The 7 Habits of Highly Effective People, first published in 1989, is a business and self-help book written by Stephen R. Covey. Covey presents an approach to being effective in attaining goals by aligning oneself to what he calls "true north" principles based on a character ethic that he presents as universal and timeless.

Covey defines effectiveness as the balance of obtaining desirable results with caring for that which produces those results. He illustrates this by referring to the fable of the goose that laid the golden eggs. He further claims that effectiveness can be expressed in terms of the P/PC ratio, where P refers to getting desired results and PC is caring for that which produces the results.

This best-known book of Covey has sold more than 40 million copies worldwide since its first publication. The audio version became the first non-fiction audio-book in U.S. publishing history to sell more than one million copies. Covey argues against what he calls the personality ethic, that he sees as prevalent in many modern self-help books. He promotes what he labels the character ethic: aligning one's values with so-called universal and timeless principles. In doing this, Covey distinguishes principles and values. He sees principles as external natural laws, while values remain internal and subjective. Our values govern our behavior, while principles ultimately determine the consequences. Covey presents his teachings in a series of habits, manifesting as a progression from dependence through independence on to interdependence.

The 7 Habits 

Covey introduces the concept of paradigm shift and helps the reader understand that different perspectives exist, i.e. that two people can see the same thing and yet differ from each other.

Covey also introduces the maturity continuum. These are three successive stages of increasing maturity: dependence, independence, and interdependence. At birth, everybody is dependent, and characteristics of dependence may linger; this is the first and lowest stage of maturity.

Each of the first three habits is intended to help achieve independence. The next three habits are intended to help achieve interdependence. The final, seventh habit is intended to help maintain these achievements. Each of the seven habits has a chapter of the book (or a section of the videotape or DVD) devoted to it:

Independence 

The first three habits surround moving from dependence to independence (i.e., self-mastery):

Habit 1: "Be proactive" 
Proactivity is about taking responsibility for one's reaction to one's own experiences, taking the initiative to respond positively and improve the situation. He postulates that "between stimulus and response lies your ability to choose" how to react, and that nothing can hurt you without your consent. Covey discusses recognizing one's circle of influence and circle of concern. Covey discusses focusing one's responses and focusing on the center of one's influence.

Habit 2: "Begin with the end in mind" 
Covey discusses envisioning what one wants in the future (a personal mission statement) so one can work and plan towards it, and understanding how people make important life decisions. To be effective one needs to act based on principles and constantly review one's mission statements, says Covey. He asks: Are you—right now—who you want to be? What do you have to say about yourself? How do you want to be remembered? If habit 1 advises changing one's life to act and be proactive, habit 2 advises that "you are the programmer". Grow and stay humble, Covey says.

Covey says that all things are created twice: Before one acts, one should act in one's mind first. Before creating something, measure twice. Do not just act; think first: Is this how I want it to go, and are these the correct consequences?

Habit 3: "Put first things first" 

Covey talks about what is important versus what is urgent. Priority should be given in the following order (in brackets are the corresponding actions from the Eisenhower matrix, which Dwight D. Eisenhower attributed to a former college president):
 Quadrant I. Urgent and important (Do) – important deadlines and crises
 Quadrant II. Not urgent but important (Plan) – long-term development
 Quadrant III. Urgent but not important (Delegate) – distractions with deadlines
 Quadrant IV. Not urgent and not important (Eliminate) – frivolous distractions

The order is important, says Covey: after completing items in quadrant I, people should spend the majority of their time on II, but many people spend too much time in III and IV. The calls to delegate and eliminate are reminders of their relative priority.

If habit 2 advises that "you are the programmer", habit 3 advises: "write the program, become a leader". Keep personal integrity by minimizing the difference between what you say versus what you do, says Covey.

Interdependence 
The next three habits talk about interdependence (i.e., working with others):

Habit 4: "Think win–win" 
Seek mutually beneficial win–win solutions or agreements in your relationships, says Covey. Valuing and respecting people by seeking a "win" for all is ultimately a better long-term resolution than if only one person in the situation had gotten their way. Thinking win–win isn't about being nice, nor is it a quick-fix technique; it is a character-based code for human interaction and collaboration, says Covey.

Habit 5: "Seek first to understand, then to be understood" 

Use empathetic listening to genuinely understand a person, which compels them to reciprocate the listening and take an open mind to be influenced. This creates an atmosphere of caring, and positive problem-solving.

Habit 5 is expressed in the ancient Greek philosophy of three modes of persuasion: 
 Ethos is one's personal credibility. It's the trust that one inspires, one's "emotional bank account".
 Pathos is the empathetic side, the alignment with the emotional trust of another person's communication.
 Logos is the logic, the reasoning part of the presentation. 
The order of the concepts indicates their relative importance, says Covey.

Habit 6: "Synergize" 
Combine the strengths of people through positive teamwork, so as to achieve goals that no one could have done alone, Covey exhorts.

Continual improvement 
The final habit is that of continuous improvement in both the personal and interpersonal spheres of influence.

Habit 7: "Sharpen the saw" 

Covey says that one should balance and renew one's resources, energy, and health to create a sustainable, long-term, effective lifestyle. He primarily emphasizes exercise for physical renewal, good prayer, and good reading for mental renewal. He also mentions service to society for spiritual renewal.

Covey explains the "upward spiral" model. Through conscience, along with meaningful and consistent progress, an upward spiral will result in growth, change, and constant improvement. In essence, one is always attempting to integrate and master the principles outlined in The 7 Habits at progressively higher levels at each iteration. Subsequent development on any habit will render a different experience and one will learn the principles with a deeper understanding. The upward spiral model consists of three parts: learn, commit, do. According to Covey, one must be increasingly educating the conscience in order to grow and develop on the upward spiral. The idea of renewal by education will propel one along the path of personal freedom, security, wisdom, and power, says Covey.

Reception 
The 7 Habits of Highly Effective People has sold more than 40 million copies in 40 languages worldwide, and the audio version has sold 1.5 million copies, and remains one of the best selling nonfiction business books in history. In August 2011 Time listed 7 Habits as one of "The 25 Most Influential Business Management Books".

U.S. President Bill Clinton invited Covey to Camp David to counsel him on how to integrate the book into his presidency.

Abundance mentality

Covey coined the term abundance mentality, or abundance mindset, a way of thinking in which a person believes there are enough resources and successes to share with others. He contrasts it with the scarcity mindset (i.e., destructive and unnecessary competition), which is founded on the idea that if someone else wins or is successful in a situation, it means "you lose", because you are not considering the possibility of all parties "winning" in some way or another in a given situation. Individuals having an abundance mentality reject the notion of zero-sum games and are able to celebrate the success of others, rather than feel threatened by them. The author contends that the abundance mentality arises from having a high self-worth and security (see habits 1, 2, and 3), and leads to the sharing of profits, recognition and responsibility. Similarly, organizations may also apply an abundance mentality when doing business.

After The 7 Habits of Highly Effective People was published,  the business press have discussed the idea.

Formats
In addition to the book and audiobook versions, a VHS version also exists.

Adaptations

Sean Covey, Stephen's son, has written a version of the book for teens, The 7 Habits of Highly Effective Teens, which simplifies the 7 Habits for younger readers to make them easier to understand. In September 2006, Sean Covey published The 6 Most Important Decisions You Will Ever Make: A Guide for Teens, which highlights key times in the life of a teen and gives advice on how to deal with them. In September 2008, Covey published The 7 Habits of Happy Kids, a children's book illustrated by Stacy Curtis which further simplifies the 7 Habits for children and teaches them through stories with anthropomorphic animal characters.

References

External links 
 Official Stephen Covey homepage

1989 non-fiction books
Business books
Self-help books
Personal development
Free Press (publisher) books
Time management